The Day of the Roses is a two-part Australian television mini-series, a docu-drama directed by Peter Fisk, based on the events of the 1977 Granville railway disaster. The film was made in 1998 and runs over 3.5 hours. Described as "a dramatic depiction of real events", it was based on a manuscript by Murray Hubbard and Ray Connor. It won the 1999 AACTA Award for Best Telefeature, Mini Series or Short Run Series.

Plot

Part 1 starts with roses being dropped on the track to commemorate those lost then shifts to the aftermath of the wreck where first responders are arriving at the scene. Five months later, the coroner, Tom Weir, brings in Boris Osman, an engineer to help him investigate the crash and Weir begins to be pressured by the state-owned rail company to conclude his report quickly. After failing to access the damaged train, Osman thinks it's because the investigation will have to disclose why the tracks that caused the wreck, and the train itself, were in such bad shape. Osman thinks it was caused by the politicians in office allowing the rail system to deteriorate, and his investigations reveal that the overweight bridge was recently hit twice before. Osman also learns this is the third time this locomotive went off the rails. Pressure begins to be brought on the coroner from Chief Stipendiary Magistrate Murray Farquhar to stop asking to look at the train, but he decides to use his authority to force the rail company to let Osman examine the locomotive.

The inquest begins, with Osman recounting how the tragedy happened early on 18 January, alternating with flashbacks of the stories of some passengers who traveled on the ill-fated train, leading up to the depiction of the accident. The train was 3 minutes late at Parramatta and was riding faster than normal to make up time. Due to worn out track and worn out wheels on the locomotive, it jumps the rails and hits the struts of a bridge, causing it to subsequently collapse on the train. The community springs into action to aid the survivors, although the worst is also shown as looters steal from rescue vehicles too. Several of the rescuers testify at the inquest and recount their actions on the day of the accident.

In Part 2, the inquest, flashbacks, and use of archive news coverage continue. Many rescuers risk their own lives to save the injured. Even when ordered to leave due to the danger of further collapse, many refuse to abandon survivors, and many are traumatized by what they saw. In all, they find 83 dead. Soon Ormond comes under attack for saying that it was the condition of the locomotive's wheels that contributed to the accident, since while $200 million has been allocated to repair the network's tracks, there is no money to also repair the locomotives. The families of the dead try to cope, while Gerry Buchtmann, who went to Granville while on sick leave from his emergency responder job has to fight to keep his job, since the powers that be want to fire him for doing just that. In spite of pressure, the coroner finds that the locomotive's condition contributed to the accident. Osman later learns that even though the rail company knew this type of locomotive was dangerous due to a derailment 11 months before Granville, they took no steps to lower the speed on this line because it came from an electoral district that often decided national elections and the government did not want to anger the voters by making their train late. We return to the memorial service, while on screen captions tell us what happened to some of the people involved in the crash and the investigation.

Cast

John Bach – Tom Weir, coroner
 Chris Betts – Sgt. Merv Masterson
 Aaron Blabey – Dr John White
 Carol Burns – Greta, Weir's secretary
 Cormac Costello – Michael "Scotty" McInally, ambulance worker
 Stephen Curry – Rescuer
 Helen Dallimore – Annette Gordon
 Gigi Edgley – Erica Watson
 Rebecca Gibney – Sister Margaret Warby, nurse
 Paul Mercurio – Bryan Gordon
 Heather Mitchell – Margaret Shuttler
 Peter O'Brien – Boris Osman, engineer
 Damian Pike – Constable Garry Raymond
 Wayne Pygram – Sgt. Joe Beecroft
 Jeremy Sims – Gerry Buchtmann
 Georgina Symes – Debbie Skow
 Steven Vidler – Dick Lamb
 Bill Young – Inspector Ray Williams
Guest appearances
 John Clayton – Murray Farquhuar, Chief Stipendary Magistrate
 Chris Haywood – Informant
 Andrew McFarlane – Public Servant
 Tim Campbell – McCrossan

Home media
The Day of the Roses was released on DVD by Umbrella Entertainment in July 2010.

References

External links
 

1998 films
1990s disaster films
1998 drama films
1990s historical films
Disaster films based on actual events
Disaster television films
Australian documentary films
Australian historical films
1990s Australian television miniseries
1998 Australian television series debuts
1998 Australian television series endings
1998 television films
Survival films
Films set in 1977
Films directed by Peter Fisk
1990s English-language films